The State Register of Heritage Places is maintained by the Heritage Council of Western Australia. , 854 places are heritage-listed in the Town of Claremont, of which 20 are on the State Register of Heritage Places.

List
The Western Australian State Register of Heritage Places, lists the following 20 state registered places within the Town of Claremont:

References

Claremont